Aly Knepper (born 11 March 1940) is a Luxembourgian former sports shooter. He competed in the trap event at the 1960 Summer Olympics.

References

1940 births
Living people
Luxembourgian male sport shooters
Olympic shooters of Luxembourg
Shooters at the 1960 Summer Olympics
People from Echternach